Teletalk Bangladesh Limited  DBA Teletalk is the only state-owned GSM, 3G, LTE, 5G based mobile phone operator in Bangladesh that started operating in 2004. As in August 2021, Teletalk has a subscriber base of 6.27 million.
It also provides a wide range of Digital Services. It works with governments vision of Digital Bangladesh.

History

Bangladesh Telephone & Telegraph Board - BTTB launched their subsidiary project of mobile network service named BTTB bMobile. Then it was rebranded to Teletalk & Teletalk Bangladesh Ltd was formed as the only public mobile operator in Bangladesh. Currently it's the fourth largest  mobile operator in Bangladesh.

Teletalk Bangladesh Limited (the "Company") was incorporated on 26 December 2004 as a public limited company under the Companies Act, 1994 with an authorized capital of Tk.20,000,000,000 being the only government sponsored mobile telephone company in the country. On the same day the Company obtained Certificate of Commencement of Business. Teletalk Bangladesh Limited launched its commercial operation on 31 March 2005.

It invested about 2 billion taka for spreading GSM network countrywide. In 2012 it inaugurated HSPA network. Then on 16 December 2018 LTE network was inaugurated .
Teletalk has forged ahead and strengthened its path over the years and achieved some feats truly to be proud of, as the only Bangladeshi mobile operator and the only operator with 100% native technical and engineering human resource base, Teletalk thrives to become the true people's phone – "Amader Phone".

According to Posts and Telecommunication Minister Mustafa Jabbar, Teletalk plans to introduce the first 5G service in Bangladesh in December 2021.

Mobile services 
Teletalk Offer's various kind of mobile services

Voice services: Teletalk Offers voice calling service ar cheaper rate in Bangladesh.

Messaging services : Teletalk Provides SMS MMS & bulk sms services.

 Internet services  :
Teletalk provides Mobile internet service

Numbering scheme

Teletalk uses the following numbering scheme for its subscribers:

+880 15 N1N2N3N4N5N6N7N8

Where, +880 is the ISD code for Bangladesh and is needed only in case of dialing from outside Bangladesh.

15 is the access code for Teletalk as allocated by the Government of Bangladesh. Omitting +880 will require using 0 in place of it instead to represent local call, hence 015 is the general access code.

N1N2N3N4N5N6N7N8 is the subscriber number.

References

External links
 Official website

Mobile phone companies of Bangladesh
Telecommunications companies established in 2004
Bangladeshi brands
Telecommunications companies of Bangladesh